Qingyun Temple, may refer to:

 Qingyun Temple (Guangdong), in Zhaoqing, Guangdong, China
 Qingyun Temple (Shanghai), in Pudong District of Shanghai, China
 Qingyun Temple (Jiangsu), in Taixing, Jiangsu, China